Gorby Run is a stream in the U.S. state of West Virginia.

Gorby Run most likely was named after the local Gorby family.

See also
List of rivers of West Virginia

References

Rivers of Doddridge County, West Virginia
Rivers of West Virginia